Pleurotomella expeditionis is a species of sea snail, a marine gastropod mollusk in the family Raphitomidae.

Description 
The length of the shell attains 6 mm, its diameter 3 mm.

Distribution
This marine species occurs off the Chatham Islands

References

 Dell, R. K. (1956). The archibenthal Mollusca of New Zealand. Dominion Museum Bulletin. 18: 1-235
 Powell, A.W.B. 1979 New Zealand Mollusca: Marine, Land and Freshwater Shells, Collins, Auckland 
 Beu, A.G. 2011 Marine Molluscs of oxygen isotope stages of the last 2 million years in New Zealand. Part 4. Gastropoda (Ptenoglossa, Neogastropoda, Heterobranchia). Journal of the Royal Society of New Zealand 41, 1–153

External links
 Spencer H.G., Willan R.C., Marshall B.A. & Murray T.J. (2011). Checklist of the Recent Mollusca Recorded from the New Zealand Exclusive Economic Zone
 Biolib.cz: Pleurotomella expeditionis
 

expeditionis
Gastropods described in 1956
Gastropods of New Zealand